John Kingsley Fleming (born 2 May 1953) is a former New Zealand rugby union player. A lock, Fleming represented Wellington and Waikato at a provincial level, and was a member of the New Zealand national side, the All Blacks, from 1978 to 1980. He played 35 matches for the All Blacks including five internationals.

References

1953 births
Living people
Rugby union players from Auckland
People educated at Auckland Grammar School
New Zealand rugby union players
New Zealand international rugby union players
Wellington rugby union players
Waikato rugby union players
Rugby union locks
New Zealand rugby union coaches